Lasioglossum albipes  is a Palearctic species of sweat bee.

References

External links
Images representing  Lasioglossum albipes

albipes
Hymenoptera of Asia
Hymenoptera of Europe
Insects described in 1781
Taxa named by Johan Christian Fabricius